Close Escape is a 1989 Hong Kong action film directed by Chow Chun-wing and starring Aaron Kwok, Max Mok and Michael Miu, who acts in his debut film role.

Plot
Lam Wai-tung has developed cancer. In order to raise money for his younger brother, Wai-leung, to study medicine overseas, he steals some diamonds for smuggler Chiu Ying-kau. After the robbery, Wai-tung hides the real diamonds for himself and gives fake diamonds to Chiu, who then finds out and kills Wai-tung. In order to recover the diamonds, Chiu sets a scheme and makes Wai-leung a murder suspect and arranges his Japanese female subordinate, Miko, to hide him and nurse his gunshot wounds. Under Miko's attentive treatment, Wai-leung heals and they establish a profound friendship.

Wai-leung's good friend, Sergeant Ben Kwok, was sent to investigate the case and later he and Wai-leung stumble across the diamonds that Wai-tung hid. Miko snatches the diamonds and Chiu arrives and forces Wai-leung to hand the diamonds over. When he refuses, Chiu plans to kill them. When Miko leaves, she sees Chiu's henchmen on the road and returns to help Wai-leung and fights with Chiu, where Miko was wounded by Chiu, who was eventually killed by Wai-leung.

Cast
Aaron Kwok as Sergeant Ben Kwok
Max Mok as Lam Wai-leung
Michael Miu as Lam Wai-tung
Dick Wei as Chiu Ying-kau
Charine Chan as Man
Yukari Oshima as Miko
William So as Wai-leung's friend who call ambulance
Chan Chik-wai as Uncle Kwat
Cheung Miu-hau as Big Head Man 
Pomson Shi as Yok
Au-yeung Tak Fan
Lam Chi-tai as Poky
Chiang Tao as Shek Sun
Chung Wai as thug
Chang Seng-kwong as thug
Cho Chung-sing
Yiu Man-kei as thug
Lam Foo-wai as thug

Box office
The film grossed HK$2,149,821 at the Hong Kong box office during its theatrical run from 18 May to 1 June 1989 in Hong Kong.

See also
Aaron Kwok filmography

External links

Close Escape at Hong Kong Cinemagic

1989 films
1980s action thriller films
1989 martial arts films
Hong Kong action thriller films
Hong Kong martial arts films
Kung fu films
Police detective films
1980s Cantonese-language films
Films set in Hong Kong
Films shot in Hong Kong
1980s Hong Kong films